Diocese of Armidale could refer to:
Anglican Diocese of Armidale
Roman Catholic Diocese of Armidale